Reheated is the twelfth album by Canned Heat, released in 1988. It features two members of the band's classic lineup, Fito de la Parra and Larry Taylor. Among the titles, "Bullfrog Blues" was originally on the B-side of the first single recorded by Canned Heat in 1967; "Built for Comfort" by Willie Dixon was popularized by Howlin' Wolf; "Take Me to the River" is a R&B/soul song which has been recorded by artists such as Al Green and Talking Heads.

Track listing
Side One
"Looking for the Party" (R. Barroso, Jim Nash) – 3:45
"Drifting" (E. Boyd) – 2:47
"I'm Watching You" (Al Blake) – 5:18
"Bullfrog Blues" (Canned Heat) – 2:57
"Hucklebuck" (Trad. Arr. Junior Watson) – 4:45
"Mercury Blues" (K.C. Douglas)– 3:14
Side Two
"Gunstreet Girl" (Tom Waits) – 3:47
"I Love to Rock & Roll (B. Bocage) – 2:35
"So Fine (Betty Jean)" (Corthen, Neill, Colbert) – 5:06
"Take Me to the River" (Al Green, M. Hodges) – 4:08
"Red Headed Woman" (Taylor, Kaplan, Mann, Innes) – 3:55
"Built for Comfort" (Willie Dixon) – 3:47

Personnel
Canned Heat
Fito de la Parra – drums, vocals
Larry Taylor – bass, guitar, vocals
James Thornbury – slide guitar, harmonica, vocals
Junior Watson – lead guitar, vocals

Production
Recording Engineer: Marvin "The Blade" McNeil
Mixed at Sounder Studios, Granada Hills, California
Mastered at Digiprep Studios, Hollywood, California
Executive Producer: Wolfgang Rott

References

1988 albums
Canned Heat albums
SPV/Steamhammer albums